The Best Man Holiday is a 2013 American comedy-drama film written, co-produced and directed by Malcolm D. Lee. A sequel to Lee's The Best Man (1999), it stars Morris Chestnut, Taye Diggs, Regina Hall, Terrence Howard, Sanaa Lathan, Nia Long, Harold Perrineau, Monica Calhoun and Melissa De Sousa, all reprising their roles from the previous film. Along with Lee, the film was produced by Sean Daniel.

Highly anticipated, the project was announced in October 2011 and principal photography began in April 2013 in Toronto, Ontario. The Best Man Holiday was released on November 15, 2013 by Universal Pictures. It received positive reviews from critics, who praised the performances of the cast, Lee's direction and the dramatic elements, with some criticism aimed at the screenplay. It was a commercial success, grossing $72.8 million worldwide on a production budget of $17 million.

The film received multiple accolades and nominations, including being nominated four times at the 45th NAACP Image Awards for Outstanding Motion Picture, Outstanding Supporting Actor in a Motion Picture (Chestnut and Howard) and Outstanding Directing in a Motion Picture (Lee).

Plot

Mia Sullivan, Lance's wife, has invited the old gang for Christmas: Harper Stewart and his pregnant wife Robyn, Julian "Murch" Murchison and wife Candace Sparks, her best friend Jordan Armstrong and boyfriend Brian McDonald, Quentin "Q" Spivey, and Shelby Taylor.

Shelby is on the hit The Real Housewives TV show franchise, and now a prominent reality television star. Q is a successful brand manager, heavily connected to prominent celebrities.

Years after his debut novel, Harper has writer's block and financial difficulties as he was let go from NYU, as well as Robyn has difficulty in conceiving. His agent suggests he write a biography of his former best friend Lance, poised to retire from football. Though on speaking terms, Lance keeps him at a distance. Harper reluctantly agrees to do it, but in secret.

The Murch family now includes two girls and Julian runs a renowned school with former stripper Candace as his head of admissions. His main donor abruptly pulls his funding from the school when he learns of Candace's past. Then Julian finds a YouTube video of her stripping and accepting money for sex at a fraternity party, which he shows Q.

All arrive, the first time together in 14 years. At dinnertime, as the friends catch up, old tensions resurface.

As Brian leaves for his family's annual Christmas gathering in Vermont, Jordan tells him that, while she loves him, she does not need him. He retorts that 'Everybody needs somebody'.

One evening the gang has a good time, with the men dancing and lip-syncing to "Can You Stand the Rain" which Mia sees has worked to patch up old wounds between Lance and Harper. Another night Harper finds Mia downstairs vomiting blood, so she admits her terminal cancer diagnosis and asks him to help Lance accept it.

At breakfast the next morning, Q and Shelby accidentally switch phones and she finds Candace's video. She tries to coerce Julian into resuming their relationship but he refuses. Soon afterwards, Candace confronts Shelby, leading to a physical altercation after which Candace leaves with the kids. Later, she returns and reconciles with Julian.

The ladies are preparing for a spa day when Mia collapses. This forces Harper to tell everyone about Mia's condition and everyone is supportive.

While Harper is wrapping the children's Christmas gifts, Lance approaches him and they reminisce about their college days, seemingly reconciling. The next day, as the gang volunteers at a shelter, Lance finds Harper's iPad and journal in Mia's purse, and a mock book cover for his unauthorized biography on the tablet. 

Lance angrily confronts Harper, telling him to stay away from him and his family, 'forever'. Mia unsuccessfully tries to calm him down. He takes her home, leaving Q and Harper behind where Harper finally breaks down and admits the truth of his financial situation. After giving humble words of comfort to Harper, Q vows to take care of his debts as a friendly favor.

Lance is still heated over the biography when Mia challenges him to face reality. The longtime feud between the two men is due to a her fling with Harper (see The Best Man), which she knew would hurt Lance. Mia then takes off her wig, forcing him to also acknowledge the severity of her condition.

Christmas Day is Lance's big game. Brian returns and apologizes to Jordan. After Lance's troublesome first half, Mia calls him. This inspires him to break the all-time rushing record. The men then hurry home to Mia who, shortly after, succumbs to the cancer.

At the memorial service, Harper delivers a heartfelt eulogy. Lance later thanks his friend and in the conversation affirms, 'But God is always there when we need him.' Harper is encouraged: 'That is why you will always be the better man.'

All reconcile and Q and Shelby face their incompatibility. She gives Julian $2 million to cover the lost funding with no strings attached. Later, Jordan's boyfriend Brian promises to help through his contacts.

Robyn's water breaks so Lance, Harper, and Candace try to rush her to the hospital but get stuck in traffic; so Lance delivers Harper's baby in the backseat of the SUV. The healthy baby girl is named Mia.

Ten months later, Harper and Lance are closer than ever and Harper has written Lance's biography, God, Family and Football. When Lance visits Harper and Robyn in NYC, Q calls to announce his anticipated marriage but jokes that Harper had better not have slept with his bride.

Cast

Production
In October 2011, it was announced that a sequel to the 1999 film The Best Man was in development. On February 22, 2013, it was announced that the film would be titled The Best Man Holiday.

In March 2013, Terrence Howard revealed details about the film, saying: "I think it's going to be amazing film and I get teary-eyed thinking about it because there's some tragedy in it. That's all I'll say...[Director and screenwriter] Malcolm Lee showed us what intelligent young black people were capable of in The Best Man I, but The Best Man II, it shows where people go, whether they're doing the right thing or the wrong thing, and how much we need each other within our community."

Principal photography began in April 2013 in Toronto, Ontario.

Reception

Box office

The Best Man Holiday debuted with a $10.7 million Friday total, notably beating Thor: The Dark World for the top box office spot of that day. The Best Man Holiday did even better the next day earning $12.4 million on Saturday. It then went on to be the number two film of the weekend, taking in close to $30.6 million. It eventually earned a total of $70.5 million in the United States and $72.8 million worldwide.

Critical response
The site's critical consensus reads, "The Best Man Holiday manages honest laughs out of broad humor, and affects convincing drama from a deeply conventional plot." Metacritic gives the film a score of 59 out of 100, based on 30 critics, indicating "mixed or average reviews". CinemaScore reported that audiences gave the film a rare "A+" grade.

The Washington Posts Ann Hornaday gave it 2.5 stars, saying the "[s]equel is both a romp and a tearjerker... Like a long-lost soap opera emerging from a Rip Van Winkle–length hiatus, 'The Best Man Holiday' has lost none of its often baggy, saggy melodrama; luckily, when things get too soppy, Howard can be depended on for crude one-liners that land with all the more finesse thanks to his smoky, slightly stoned delivery. ...And 'The Best Man Holiday' has clearly caught up with the times, with one plot point revolving around social media run amok, off-handedly invoking everyone from Barack Obama (natch) to Melissa Harris-Perry, Olivia Pope and Robin Thicke".

Soundtrack

The film's soundtrack includes songs by R. Kelly, Jordin Sparks, Mary J. Blige, Monica, Ne-Yo, Marsha Ambrosius, John Legend, Emeli Sandé, and more.

Awards and nominations
Acapulco Black Film Festival
 Best Ensemble Cast (winner)
 Best Actress—Nia Long (winner)
 Best Supporting Actor—Terrence Howard (winner)
 Best Actor—Morris Chestnut (nominated)
 Movie of the Year—Malcolm D. Lee and Sean Daniel (nominated)
 Best Screenplay—Malcolm D. Lee (nominated)
 Best Supporting Actress—Sanaa Lathan (nominated)
 Best Director—Malcolm D. Lee (nominated)

14th BET Awards
 Best Movie (nominated)

2014 Black Reel Awards
 Outstanding Actress, Motion Picture—Nia Long (nominated)
 Outstanding Director, Motion Picture—Malcolm D. Lee (nominated)
 Outstanding Screenplay (Adapted or Original), Motion Picture—Malcolm D. Lee (nominated)
 Outstanding Ensemble—Julie Hutchinson (nominated)
 Outstanding Score—Stanley Clarke (nominated)

45th NAACP Image Awards
 Outstanding Motion Picture (nominated)
 Outstanding Supporting Actor in a Motion Picture—Morris Chestnut (nominated)
 Outstanding Supporting Actor in a Motion Picture—Terrence Howard (nominated)
 Outstanding Directing in a Motion Picture—Malcolm D. Lee (nominated)

Sequel
In February  2021, Peacock gave a limited series order to a follow-up consisting of ten episodes. The Best Man: The Final Chapters is created by Lee and Dayna Lynne North, who also serve as executive producers. Chestnut, Diggs, Hall, Howard, Lathan, Long, Perrineau and De Sousa are set to reprise their roles. The 8-episode series premiered on December 22, 2022.

See also
List of black films of the 2010s
List of Christmas films

References

External links
 
 
 
 The Best Man Holiday at the ComingSoon.net
 http://www.best-man.com/timeline/

2013 films
African-American films
American Christmas comedy-drama films
American sequel films
Films scored by Stanley Clarke
Films about cancer
Films about death
Films about vacationing
Films about writers
Films directed by Malcolm D. Lee
American pregnancy films
Tragicomedy films
Universal Pictures films
2010s pregnancy films
2010s Christmas comedy-drama films
New York Giants
Films set in New York (state)
Films shot in New York (state)
Films shot in Toronto
2010s English-language films
2010s American films